Tiffany Travis (born March 20, 1978) is a retired American professional basketball player in the Women's National Basketball Association (WNBA).

Travis was born in Picayune, Mississippi.  She attended Harrison Central High School in Gulfport, Mississippi, where she played high school basketball for the Harrison Central Red Rebels.  She graduated from Harrison Central in 1996.

She accepted an athletic scholarship to attend the University of Florida, and Travis excelled for coach Carol Ross's Florida Gators women's basketball team from 1996 to 2000.  Travis was a second-team All-Southeastern Conference (SEC) selection as a senior in 2000.  She graduated from the University of Florida with a bachelor's degree in 2000.

Travis was selected in the second round, 11th pick overall, of the 2000 WNBA Draft by the Charlotte Sting. She played in all 32 games, starting 12 of them, as a rookie.  She scored 10 or more points on four occasions, including a career-high of 16.  Among her 2000 Sting teammates, she scored the fifth-highest point total (173), and was sixth in points per game (5.4).  Her 81 rebounds were the fifth-most on the team.  Her 31 steals were the third-highest on the Sting, and seventh-highest among 2000 WNBA rookies.  She led the Sting in three-point field goal percentage (48.0%), and was fourth in three-point field goals made (12) and attempted (25).

Her WNBA career ended as a result of a 2001 knee injury.

Florida statistics
Source

See also 

 List of Florida Gators in the WNBA
 List of University of Florida alumni

References

External links 
 Stats for Travis with Charlotte Sting, 2000

1978 births
Living people
American women's basketball players
Basketball players from Mississippi
Charlotte Sting players
Florida Gators women's basketball players
People from Picayune, Mississippi
Forwards (basketball)
Guards (basketball)